Ivan Nikolaevich Khudoleyev (Russian: Иван Николаевич Худолеев; 24 September 1875 – 19 May 1932) was a Soviet silent film actor.

Selected filmography 
Be Silent, My Sorrow, Be Silent (1918)
The Last Tango (1918)
The Iron Heel (1919)
Locksmith and Chancellor (1923)
The Decembrists (1927)
The Poet and the Tsar (1927)
''Kastus Kalinovskiy (1928)

External links 

1875 births
1932 deaths
Soviet male actors